Karim Hisami or Kerîmî Hisamî, (1926–2001) was an Iranian-Kurdish writer. He was born in the village of Beyrem near Mahabad.  His real name was Karimi Mirza Hamed. Karim Hisami was his pen-name. At early age, he became involved in politics, and was registered as the 18th member of Komeley Jiyanewey Kurd party. He was a member of political bureau of Kurdistan Democratic Party of Iran until 1984. He lived most of his life in exile. In 1958, he fled to Iraq. In 1960, he moved to Czechoslovakia, where he studied in university. In the 1970s, he was working in Radio Peyk Iran (Radio Iranian Messenger) in Bulgaria. He went back to Iran in 1978 after the revolution. In 1985 he moved to Sweden, where he stayed until his death on October 6, 2001. In Sweden, he published a Kurdish journal titled Serdemî Nwê from 1986 to 1990. He was also closely affiliated with the Iraqi Communist Party.
He is famous for his memoires, titled Le Bîreweriyekanim (From my memoires).  He published eleven volumes of his massive memoires, between 1986 and 2001. This work is an important source for the study of Kurdish political movements in Iran. He has also translated literary works of Maxim Gorky, Ignazio Silone and Nikos Kazantzakis into Kurdish.

Publications 
 Karwanêk le şehîdanî Kurdistanî Êran (The martyrs of the Iranian Kurdistan), 1971
 Pêdaçûnewe (Review), Mardin Publishers, Sweden.  / 9188880230 
 Le Bîreweriyekanim (From my memoires), Vol. I, 316 pp., Jîna Nû Publishers, Uppsala, Sweden, 1986.  
 Komarî Dêmokratî Kurdistan yan Xudmuxtarî (The Kurdistan Democratic Republic or Autonomy), 112 pp., Azad Publishers, Sverige, Sweden, 1986.
 Le Bîreweriyekanim: 1957–1965, Vol.II., 164 pp., Stockholm, 1987. 
 Yadî Hêmin, 97 pp., Kista, 1987.
 Le Bîreweriyekanim: 1965–1970, Vol. III, 250 pp., Stockholm, 1988.  
 Le Bîreweriyekanim: 1970–1975, Vol. IV, 235 pp., Stockholm, 1990. 
 Le Bîreweriyekanim: 1975–1979, Vol. V, 291 pp., Stockholm, 1991.  
 Le Bîreweriyekanim: 1979–1983, Vol. VI, 295 pp., Stockholm, 1992.  
 Le Bîreweriyekanim: 1983–1985, Vol. VII, 275 pp., Stockholm, 1994.  
 Seferê bo Kurdistan (A Travel to Kurdistan), Stockholm, 1994. 
 Geştêk benêw Bîreweriyekanda, 303 pp., Solförl. Publishers, Sullentuna, 1997. 
 Dîmokrasî çiye? (What is Democracy?), 230 pp., Mukriyani Publishers, Arbil, 2001.

Translation
Dayik, translation of Mother by Maxim Gorky.
Azadî yan Merg, translation of Freedom or Death by Nikos Kazantzakis
Nan û şerab, translation of Bread and Wine by Ignazio Silone, Ministry of Education  Publishers, Arbil, Iraqi Kurdistan, 2003.

References
Karim Hisami, Immigrant Institute (in Swedish)

External links
 List of Author's books- WorldCat.org
 Interview- University of Toronto

1926 births
2001 deaths
Iranian writers
Kurdish-language writers
Iranian Kurdish people
Kurdish scholars